The men's 20 kilometres walk was the shorter of the two men's racewalking events on the Athletics at the 1968 Summer Olympics program in Mexico City.  It was held on 14 October 1968. 34 athletes from 20 nations entered.

Results

References

Men's 20 kilometres walk
Racewalking at the Olympics
Men's events at the 1968 Summer Olympics